Nezha Bidouane (born on 18 September 1969 in Rabat) is a retired Moroccan track and field hurdler who specialised in the 400 metres hurdles. A two-time World champion, she won the 400 m hurdles gold medal at the 1997 World Championships in Athens and the 2001 World Championships in Edmonton. In 1999, she won the silver medal at the World Championships in an African record time of 52.90 seconds. In 2000, she won the bronze medal at the Olympic Games.

Bidouane oversees the annual Women's Race to Victory 8K road race in Rabat.

Competition record

1Representing Africa

References

External links

1969 births
Living people
Sportspeople from Rabat
Moroccan female hurdlers
Olympic athletes of Morocco
Olympic bronze medalists for Morocco
Athletes (track and field) at the 1992 Summer Olympics
Athletes (track and field) at the 2000 Summer Olympics
Athletes (track and field) at the 2004 Summer Olympics
World Athletics Championships athletes for Morocco
World Athletics Championships medalists
Medalists at the 2000 Summer Olympics
Olympic bronze medalists in athletics (track and field)
Mediterranean Games gold medalists for Morocco
Athletes (track and field) at the 1991 Mediterranean Games
Athletes (track and field) at the 1993 Mediterranean Games
Athletes (track and field) at the 1997 Mediterranean Games
Mediterranean Games medalists in athletics
World Athletics Championships winners
Competitors at the 2001 Goodwill Games